Hammatoderus elatus is a species of beetle in the family Cerambycidae. It was described by Henry Walter Bates in 1872. It is known from Mexico, Costa Rica, Ecuador, Colombia, Honduras, Panama, and Nicaragua.

References

Hammatoderus
Beetles described in 1872